Haalke is a surname. Notable people with the surname include:

Eva Haalke (1912–2003), Norwegian dancer and ballet teacher
Hjalmar Haalke (1894–1964), Norwegian painter, brother of Eva
Magnhild Haalke (1885–1984), Norwegian novelist

Norwegian-language surnames